A Woman for a Season is a 1969 Romanian comedy film directed by Gheorghe Vitanidis. It was entered into the 6th Moscow International Film Festival where Irina Petrescu won the award for Best Actress. The film was selected as the Romanian entry for the Best Foreign Language Film at the 42nd Academy Awards, but was not accepted as a nominee.

Cast
 Ioana Bulcă
 Iurie Darie as Palaloga
  as Doctor
 Irina Petrescu as Ana

See also
 List of submissions to the 42nd Academy Awards for Best Foreign Language Film
 List of Romanian submissions for the Academy Award for Best Foreign Language Film

References

External links
 

1969 films
1969 comedy films
1960s Romanian-language films
Films directed by Gheorghe Vitanidis
Romanian comedy films